Juan José González Argüelles (born 9 October 1973), known as Juanjo, is a Spanish retired footballer who played as a goalkeeper, and manager.

Career
Born in Gijón, Asturias, Juanjo spent most of his playing career with hometown club Sporting de Gijón, making 77 total appearances including 14 in La Liga early on. He began his managerial career in Tercera División with UP Langreo and CD Llanes.

On 11 November 2009, Juanjo and fellow assistant Fede Castaños managed Racing de Santander in the second leg of their last-16 tie with UD Salamanca following the dismissal of Juan Carlos Mandiá, winning 4–1 at home for a 4–2 aggregate win.

In late November 2011, Hector Cúper was dismissed from Racing, who were last-place in the top flight with nine points. To save money in the club that was administration, three current employees were promoted to manager – Juanjo, Castaños and Pablo Pinillos. Juanjo alone was sacked the following March.

Juanjo returned to football in early February 2013 with Real Avilés of Segunda División B. In May, having avoided relegation with a late run of form, his deal was not renewed.

References

External links
 
 

1973 births
Living people
Footballers from Gijón
Spanish footballers
Association football goalkeepers
La Liga players
Segunda División players
Segunda División B players
Tercera División players
Sporting de Gijón B players
CD Linares players
Spanish football managers
Racing de Santander managers
Real Avilés CF managers